The  is a railway line in Kyushu, in southern Japan, operated by Kyushu Railway Company (JR Kyushu). The line connects Kokura Station in Kitakyushu, Fukuoka, and Kagoshima Station in Kagoshima via the east coast of Kyushu, passing through the prefectural capitals of Ōita and Miyazaki. A number of Limited Express trains operate along the route, including Limited Express Sonic trains between Hakata and Oita.

Stations
●: Stops
▲: Rapid service connecting to Hitahikosan Line non-stop,
｜: Non-stop
Liner services: Sawayaka Liner, Home Liner 

Though Kagoshima is the southern terminus for the line, some trains continue via the Kagoshima Main Line to the adjacent Kagoshima-Chūō station.

History
The Kyushu Railway Co. opened the 6 km Kokura - Jono section in 1895, and the Hōshū Railway Co. opened the 46 km Yukuhashi - Buzen Nagasu section in 1897. The former company acquired the latter in 1901, and was nationalised in 1907. The lines were connected in 1909, and extended south to Usa in the same year, the line reaching Beppu and Oita in 1911, Usuki in 1915 and Shigeoka in 1922.

The section from Kagoshima - Hayato opened as part of the Hisatsu line in 1901.

The original rail connection to Miyazaki (via the Kitto Line) opened in 1916, and the line was extended north to Takanabe in 1920, Bibi Tsu in 1921 and connected to the line from Kokura in 1923. The line west of Miyakonojo opened in sections from 1929, connecting to Hayato in 1932.

The 2.8 km Obase - Yukuhashi section was the first to be duplicated in 1956, and the Kokura - Jono section was double-tracked by 1958, continued to Obase by 1965 and extended south to Tateishi by 1983. The Naka Yamaga - Kisuki section was double-tracked between 1977 and 1978, and the Hiji - Oita section between 1966 and 1987.

The 152 km Kokura - Saizaki section was electrified in 1967, extended 191 km to Minami Miyazaki in 1974, and a further 120 km to Kagoshima in 1979.

Former connecting lines

A 3 km 'Kokura Bypass' line (junctioning 2 km north of Kokura on the Kagoshima Main Line) to the Nippo Main Line was opened in 1903, together with another line linking back to the Kagoshima Main Line south of Kokura. The 'Bypass' was built due to the Japanese army expressing concern at the vulnerability of Kokura to enemy naval gunfire. However, following Japan's success in the 1904 Russo-Japanese War, this concern diminished and the Kokura Bypass sections closed in 1911.

 Jono station - The 4 km Nishitetsu Northern Line was built as a 1067mm (3'6") gauge line to Kawaraguchi between 1906/07. It was regauged to 1435mm and electrified at 600 VDC in 1920, and extended from Kawaraguchi to Uomachi (on the Kagoshima Main Line) in 1932. The line closed in 1980.
 Unoshima station - The Yabakei Railway Co. opened the 762mm (2'6") gauge 17 km line to Yabakei in sections between 1914 and 1918 and was replaced by a bus service in 1936.

 Nakatsu station - The Yabakei Railway Co. also opened the 36 km 762mm gauge line to Morizane Onsen in sections between 1913 and 1924. The line was regauged to 1067mm in 1929. In 1944 the line commenced servicing the Nakatsu Steel works, until it closed in 1966. The 26 km section beyond Noji closed in 1971, with the remainder closing in 1975.
 Buzen Zenkoji station - The 16 km 762mm gauge line to Buzen Futsukaichi opened in 1914/15, and closed in 1951 as a result of bridge damage caused by Typhoon Ruth.
 Usa station - The 9 km line from Bungotakada to Usa Hachiman, including a connection to and overpass of the Nippo Main line at Usa, opened in 1916, closing in 1965.
 Kitsuki station - The 30 km line to Kunisaki line was opened in sections between 1922 and 1935. A planned extension to Bungotakada was not built. Typhoon damage to bridges in 1961 saw the line formally closed in 1965.
 Beppu Daigaku station - the Miyazaki Prefectural government built a human powered 1.7 km line of unknown gauge to the Sumiyoshi shrine in 1914. It closed in 1929.
 Nishi Oita station - The 2 km freight line to Oita Minato operated 1911-1984.
 Saizaki station - The Nippon Mining Co. opened a 9 km 762mm gauge line to Nikko Saganoseki in 1946. Passenger services commenced in 1948, freight service ceased in 1960 and the line closed in 1963.

 Nobeoka station - The 50 km line to Takachiho was opened to Hinokage (38 km) between 1935 and 1939, and to Takachiho in 1972. Construction of the 27 km section to the Takamori line continued until 1977, when flooding 2050m into the 6500m Takamori tunnel (16 km north of Takachiho) resulted in work being suspended. Construction was formally abandoned in 1980, after 30% of the line had been constructed. Freight service ceased in 1974, and in 1982 all service was suspended for four months due to Typhoon damage. In 1989 the line was transferred to the Third Sector Takachiho Railway, which operated until the line was extensively damaged by a typhoon in 2005, formal closure occurring in 2008.
 Hyuga station - The 3.5 km line to Hoso-to Port opened in 1921. Passenger services ceased in 1972 and the line closed in 1993.
 Sadowara station - The 19 km line to Hokita opened in 1922. Freight services ceased in 1972 and the line closed in 1984.
 Nishi Miyakonojo station - The 39 km line to Shibushi opened between 1923 and 1925, connecting to the Nichinan Line. Freight service ended in 1983 and the line closed in 1987.
 Kokubo station - The 98 km line to Shibushi, also connecting to the Nichinan Line, was not completed until 1972. The first section was opened by the Osumi Light Railway Co. as a 762mm gauge line from Funama to Kushira, via a reversing station at Kanoya, between 1915 and 1923. The line was nationalised in 1935, the same year the Shibushi - Higashikushira line was opened by JR. The 1 km connection to Kushira opened the following year, and in 1938 the Kushira - Funama section was regauged, with a new station at Kanoya removing the need to reverse direction there. The Funama - Kaigata section opened in 1961 as a passenger only line, and the Kaigata - Kokubu section also opened without freight service. The rest of the line lost freight service in 1982, and the entire line closed in 1987.

Accidents
On September 17, 2006 at 14:05, the Nichirin Number 9 train on the Nippo Line derailed near Minami-Nobeoka Station, causing some injuries.

References

Lines of Kyushu Railway Company
Rail transport in Fukuoka Prefecture
Rail transport in Ōita Prefecture
Rail transport in Miyazaki Prefecture
Rail transport in Kagoshima Prefecture
1067 mm gauge railways in Japan